Tetrahydromethanopterin (THMPT) is a coenzyme in methanogenesis. It is the carrier of the C1 group as it is reduced to the methyl level, before transferring to the coenzyme M.

Tetrahydrosarcinapterin (THSPT) is a modified form of THMPT, wherein a glutamyl group linked to the 2-hydroxyglutaric acid terminus.

THMPT is the main platform for C1 transformations 

N-Formylmethanofuran donates the C1 group to the N5 site of the pterin to give the formyl- THMPT.  The formyl group subsequently condenses intramolecularly to give methenyl- , which is then reduced to methylene- THMPT.  Methylene- MPT is subsequently converted, using coenzyme F420 as the electron source, to methyl- THMPT, catalyzed by F420-dependent methylene-THMPT reductase. Methyl- THMPT is the methyl donor to coenzyme M, a conversion mediated by methyl-THMPT:coenzyme M methyltransferase.

Comparison with tetrahydrofolic acid 

THMPT is related to the better known tetrahydrofolic acid (THFA). The most important difference between THMPT and THFA is that THFA has an electron-withdrawing carbonyl group on the phenyl ring. As a consequence, methenyl- THMPT is more difficult to reduce than methenyl- THFA. Reduction is effected by a so-called iron-sulfur cluster free hydrogenase. The cumbersome name distinguishes this hydrogenase from the so-called Fe-only hydrogenases that do contain Fe-S cluster.

References 

Coenzymes
Pteridines